Mark Boyce (born 6 March 1960) is an Australian singer, particularly known in France for his 1989 hit "Hey Little Girl".

Boyce was a solo artist, had a minor role in movies, and has had a modelling career when, in 1989, he decided to start a solo career with the song "Hey Little Girl", which peaked at No.6 on the French SNEP Singles Chart, and was certified Silver disc by the SNEP. Since then, the song has been much broadcast on radio.

He lives in Australia.

Discography
He released three singles from his album All Over the World : "Hey Little Girl"; plus "Questa Sera" and "Classic Story of Love", which both achieved minor success (they failed to enter the French Singles Chart).

References

Australian male singers
Australian pop singers
Living people
1960 births